James Hutton (8 August 1906 – 16 October 1985) was a Scotland international rugby union player.

Rugby Union career

Amateur career

When playing for Kent county he was noted as playing for Westminster Bank.

He played for a Lieutenant Brown's XV against Halifax.

Hutton played for Harlequins.

Provincial career

He played for Kent county.

He played for Anglo-Scots against Provinces District on 20 December 1930.

Of the Anglos match, the Aberdeen Press and Journal of 22 December 1930 noted:
J. E. Hutton, after a tentative kind beginning, ended by winning the match for his side, and stamped himself a three-quarter of the highest class. His defence and attack were both excellent.

The Dundee Courier noted in the same date:
Hutton has the artistry, and is admirably built for a Centre. The spotlight showed up very few weaknesses in his case.

That performance propelled Hutton into the final trial match on 10 January 1931 where he played for the Scotland Probables side against the Scotland Possibles.

International career

He played for Scotland 2 times from 1930 to 1931.

Banking career

Hutton was employed in the Hong Kong and Shanghai bank and played rugby union for their company side; and also captained the United Banks XV.

References

1906 births
1985 deaths
Scottish rugby union players
Scotland international rugby union players
Rugby union centres
Harlequin F.C. players
Kent County RFU players
Scottish Exiles (rugby union) players
Scotland Probables players
Sportspeople from Tianjin